WBTK is a Spanish religious formatted broadcast radio station licensed to and serving Richmond, Virginia.  WBTK is owned and operated by Mount Rich Media, LLC.

History
The station was founded in 1927 as WMBG ("Magnetos, Batteries, and Generators"), a 10-watt station on AM 1380, by auto parts dealer Wilbur Havens.  It was based on the second floor of Havens' shop on West Broad and Laurel streets in downtown Richmond. Havens spent $500 to build the station. By 1939, it had moved to a new studio a few blocks down West Broad. In 1947, he added an FM station on 98.1, WCOD (now WTVR-FM), followed a year later by the South's first television station, WTVR-TV (channel 6). Channel 6 is still located on West Broad, years after its former radio sisters moved out.

Havens sold WTVR, WMBG, and WCOD to Roy H. Park Communications in 1966. Park changed the radio stations' callsigns to WTVR (AM) and WTVR-FM, respectively. When Park died in 1993, the company's assets were sold to a Lexington, Kentucky group of investors that sold the radio properties separately to various owners, with WTVR-AM-FM going to Clear Channel (now iHeartMedia) in 1995. The AM station changed its calls to WVBB in 2000. Clear Channel sold the AM station to Salem Communications in 2001 and changed the format to Christian talk under its current calls, WBTK. It has since been sold to locally-based Mount Rich Media and airs Spanish Christian talk.

References

External links
 

1926 establishments in Virginia
Spanish-language radio stations in the United States
Radio stations established in 1926
BTK
Talk radio stations in the United States
Spanish-language mass media in Virginia
Radio stations in Richmond, Virginia